Lost Cause Motors was an American automobile manufacturer, based in Louisville, Kentucky from 1963 to 1964. Its founder, Charles P. Farmsley, had previously been mayor of Louisville and worked at the coachbuilding company Derham Body Company in Rosemont, Pennsylvania.

Model description

The only creation of Lost Cause was a Chevrolet Corvair-based limousine, equipped with all imaginable luxury equipment. The seats and roof were covered with black leather, the dashboard was made of Kentucky walnut. The instruments in the dashboard were supplemented by an altimeter, a compass, a timer and various fittings for use in the rally sport. Also included were a picnic set and a suitcase set.

The standard six-cylinder boxer engine with 2376 cm³ displacement and  power at 4400 rpm could be tuned by John Fitch & Co. to deliver , and in this configuration the car reached 185 km/h.

Bibliography
John Gunnell: Standard Catalog of American Cars 1946–1975. Krause Publications, Inc., Iola, Wisconsin (2002). 
George Nick Georgano (Chief Editor): The Beaulieu Encyclopedia of the Automobile. Volume 2: G-O. Fitzroy Dearborn Publishers, Chicago 2001, p. 922. (English)
Defunct motor vehicle manufacturers of the United States
Defunct manufacturing companies based in Kentucky
1960s cars
Luxury vehicles